Union Mountain is a  summit located in Flathead County of the U.S. state of Montana.

Description

Union Mountain is located in the Flathead Range, a subset of the Rocky Mountains. It is situated in the Great Bear Wilderness, on land managed by Flathead National Forest. Schafer Meadows, Shafer Ranger Station, and the Schafer landing strip are set below the mountain's northeast base. The landing strip was grandfathered with the wilderness designation. The landing strip provides access for hikers, hunters, and river rafters. The nearest higher neighbor is Capitol Mountain,  to the west-southwest.

Climate

Based on the Köppen climate classification, Union Mountain is located in a subarctic climate zone characterized by long, usually very cold winters, and short, cool to mild summers. Winter temperatures can drop below −10 °F with wind chill factors below −30 °F.

Geology

Union Mountain is composed of sedimentary rock laid down during the Precambrian to Jurassic periods.

Gallery

See also
 Geology of the Rocky Mountains
 Argosy Mountain

References

External links
 Weather: Union Mountain

Mountains of Flathead County, Montana
Mountains of Montana
North American 2000 m summits
Flathead National Forest